Pliomeridius is an extinct genus of trilobite in the family Pliomeridae.

References

Pliomeridae
Articles created by Qbugbot